Patrick McKelvey (born 25 December 1935) is an English cricketer. He played two first-class matches for Surrey between 1959 and 1960.

See also
 List of Surrey County Cricket Club players

References

External links
 

1935 births
Living people
English cricketers
Surrey cricketers
Cricketers from Hertfordshire